88.3 One FM (DWGO 88.3 MHz) is an FM station in the Philippines owned and operated by the Radio Corporation of the Philippines. Its studios and transmitter are located at Purok 5, Brgy. Rawis, Legazpi, Albay.

The station was formerly a simulcast of DWRL from its inception in November 2015 to May 2019, when it was launched as 88.3 One FM. Its DWRL simulcast was retained in the morning.

References

External links
One FM FB Page

Radio stations in Legazpi, Albay
Radio stations established in 2015